The following are the junior world records in Olympic weightlifting. They are the best results set in competition by athletes aged 15 to 20 throughout the entire calendar year of the performance. Records are maintained in each weight class for the snatch, clean and jerk, and total for both lifts by the International Weightlifting Federation (IWF).

The recognition of the junior classification and subsequent record keeping began in 1962 for men and 1995 for women. The first stand-alone Junior World Championships were held in 1975 for men and 1995 for women.

Current records
Key to tables:

Men

Women

Historical records

Men (1998–2018)

Men (1993–1997)

Men (1973–1992)

Women (1998–2018)

Women (1995–1997)

References
General
Junior World Records – Men 20 October 2022 updated
Junior World Records – Men 20 October 2022 updated
Specific

External links 
 International Weightlifting Federation

World, junior
Weightlifting junior
Under-20 sport